Offinso, is a town in the Offinso Municipality in the Ashanti Region of Ghana. The town is about fifteen minutes drive from Kumasi, the capital of the Ashanti Region; due to Offinso's proximity to Kumasi, many of the Offinso natives have relocated to Kumasi.

The indigenous people are Asante (Asantefoɔ) thus the dominance of Asante Culture in the town. 

Offinso is the anglicised version of 'ɔfenso'. The town was named after the River Ofe (ɔfe in Asante) which serves as the boundary for the Offinso  South Municipality and Ahenkro, a town in the Afigya Sekyere District also in Ashanti Region.

History and population 

The old Offinso District was divided into Offinso South Municipal and Offinso North District with their capitals at New Offinso and Akomadan respectively.

According to the 2000 Population Census in Ghana, 138,190 inhabitants were living in Offinso - most of them being the native Asante people.

In the early 18th century, Offinso played a role in the conquering of Denkyira, Akyem and Bono territory during the great expansion of the Ashanti Empire. The founder and first king of the Ashanti Kingdom, Nana Osei Tutu I rewarded Offinsohene, Nana Wiafe Akenten I with a vast amount of land for his enormous contributions in war. History has it that the vast land was given to the Offinsohene on his request. He wanted nothing but land as his reward for the contributions he made during the war.

Typical of any Akan community, Offinso has a festival called Mmoaninko (Mmoaninkɔ), the festival remembers the great efforts of Nana Wiafe Akenten I and the people of Offinso in war.

Occupations 

Most of the inhabitants are farmers whilst others also work as traders, teachers, drivers, doctors, nurses, lawyers, military officers, accountants and others.

Offinso South Municipal is home to four large market centres: Kɔkɔte, Krofrom, Anyinasuso and the Abɔfoɔ (Abofour) markets - people living in and around Offinso bring food items, clothes, shoes and other items to sell during the market days: Sunaday, Friday, Tuesday and Thursday respectively.

Education 

Offinso has several government-owned and private Primary and Junior High Schools; Offinso is also home to the Offinso Training College (OTC) now Offinso College of Education, Jones Polytechnic, Dwamena Akenten Senior High School, Namong Senior High Technical School, St. Jerome Senior High School, The Bible Baptist Missionary Association of Africa Bible School (Agyeimpra, Offinso) and the St. Patrick's Midwifery Training School (Maase - Offinso). There is also a technical school at Amoawi, a suburb of Offinso.

The University of Education, Winneba has planned to open a campus at Offinso. 

A two-storey library complex has also been built in Offinso to assist students of this town in their studies.

Some of the Primary and Junior High Schools are Offinso State 'A' JHS (public), OTC JHS (public), Abofour New Life Int. School (Abofour - Offinso), Blessed Child School (private), King Solomon Int. School (private),Offinso State 'B' JHS (public), Offinso State 'C' JHS (public), Immaculate Heart Preparatory (private), Future Island School (private), Osei Sarpong International School (Private), Namong Methodist JHS (Public), Agyeimpra Methodist Primary School (Public), Dominican International School (Private) etc.

Politics

List of traditional rulers
The town is ruled by the ɔmanhene (the paramount Chief) and his sub chiefs. Below is the list of rulers of Offinso since its founding in the 16th century.

 Nana Foroben Twea 1540-1556 
 Nana Amponsa Kwatia 1556-1580 
 Nana Abena Boa ( Woman ) 1580-1630 
 Nana Dankwa Gyeawowa 1630-1660 
 Nana Dwamena Akenten I 1660-1701 
 Nana Wiafe Akenten I (also known as Nana wiafe Kofi or Wiafe Kwagyan.) 1701-1730
 Nana Wiafe Taapem   
 Nana Amponsah Akyiano 
 Nana Yankyera Korkor 
 Nana Naka Abigi 
 Nana Gyan Frimpong 
 Nana Nyankomago Yaw 
 Nana Yaw Ofeh (During his reign, Abofuo Mmie and other gods were founded.) 
 Nana Kwaku Dwoma 
 Nana Kwadwo Appiasei 
 Nana Kwadwo Appiah (also known by the name Nana Kwadwo Kwahu) 
 Nana Yaw Berko 
 Nana Kofi Kessie 
 Nana Kwabena Konadu 
 Nana Kwame Duodu 
 Nana Kwabena Opoku (Known to have built the Offinso palace at Tutuase.) 
 Nana Kofi Boateng (Also known by the name Nana Kofi Minkah.) 
 Nana Kwabena Wiafe (Also known  by the name Nana Kwabena Sanwo Ansah, he was enstooled twice as Offinsohene.)
 Nana Wiafe Akenten II 
 Nana Wiafe Akenten III

MPs and MCEs
Offinso also has a Municipal Chief Executive who is  appointed by the president of Ghana.

The town also has one representative at the Ghana's  Parliament - the current MP for Offinso South Constituency is Hon. Ben Abdallah Bandah - he belongs to the New Patriotic Party, NPP.

Accommodations 

Offinso has several hotels and guesthouses - BECO Guest House (Main and Annex), PKD Guest House, Bakana Hotel, Bakana Guest House, Tonto Guest House, Power Guest House (Abofour), etc.
An additional use of a software application by name Booking.com that helps tourist in finding accommodation.

Notable people 

 Most Rev Dr Peter Kwasi Sarpong, Archbishop Emeritus of the Catholic Archdiocese of Kumasi 
 Dr. I.Y Opoku (former executive director, Seed Production Division (COCOBOD), former managing director (QCC, COCOBOD)   
 Nana Kwabena Ofori Agyemang aka Dada Santo (Oboy Siki), Ghanaian Actor 
 Dominic Adiyiah (striker, Nakhon Ratchasima and the National Team, Black Stars of Ghana)
 Rev. Obofour, Founder and leader, Anointed Palace Chapel 
 Barbara Serwaa Asamoah, former Deputy Minister under NDC 
 Nikoletta Samonas (known as Nikki Samonas in the entertainment industry), Ghanaian Actress

Religion 

Christianity dominates in this town though  there is a significant number of Muslims and Traditional Worshipers in this town.

References

Populated places in the Ashanti Region